The Indian Foreign Service (IFS) is the diplomatic service and a central civil service of the Government of India under the Ministry of External Affairs. The Foreign Secretary is the head of the service. Vinay Mohan Kwatra is the 34th and the current Foreign Secretary.

The service, consisting of civil servants is entrusted with handling the foreign relations of India, providing consular services and to mark India's presence in international organizations. It is the body of career diplomats serving in more than 160 Indian diplomatic missions and international organizations around the world. In addition, they serve at the President's Secretariat, the Prime Minister's Office and at the headquarters of MEA in New Delhi. They also head Regional Passport Offices throughout the country and hold positions in several ministries on deputation.

Post-retirement, Indian Foreign Service officers have held high offices including that of President, Vice President, Governors of States, Speaker of Lok Sabha, Cabinet ministers, National security advisors.

History

On 13 September 1783, the board of directors of the East India Company passed a resolution at Fort William, Calcutta (now Kolkata), to create a department, which could help "relieve the pressure" on the Warren Hastings administration in conducting its "secret and political business." Although established by the Company, the Indian Foreign Department conducted business with foreign European powers. From the very beginning, a distinction was maintained between the foreign and political functions of the Foreign Department; relations with all "Asiatic powers" (including native princely states) were treated as political, while relations with European powers were treated as foreign.

In 1843, the Governor-General of India, Edward Law, 1st Earl of Ellenborough carried out administrative reforms, organizing the Secretariat of the Government into four departments: Foreign, Home, Finance, and Military. Each was headed by a secretary-level officer. The Foreign Department Secretary was entrusted with the "conduct of all correspondence belonging to the external and internal diplomatic relations of the government."

The Government of India Act 1935 attempted to delineate more clearly functions of the foreign and political wings of the Foreign Department, it was soon realized that it was administratively imperative to completely bifurcate the department. Consequently, the External Affairs Department was set up separately under the direct charge of the Governor-General.

The idea of establishing a separate diplomatic service to handle the external activities of the Government of India originated from a note dated 30 September 1944, recorded by Lieutenant-General T. J. Hutton, the Secretary of the Planning and Development Department. When this note was referred to the Department of External Affairs for comments, Olaf Caroe, the Foreign Secretary, recorded his comments in an exhaustive note detailing the scope, composition and functions of the proposed service. Caroe pointed out that as India emerged as autonomous, it was imperative to build up a system of representation abroad that would be in complete harmony with the objectives of the future government.

On 9 October 1946, the Indian government established the Indian Foreign Service for India's diplomatic, consular and commercial representation overseas. With independence, there was a near-complete transition of the Foreign and Political Department into what then became the new Ministry of External Affairs.

Indian Foreign Service Day is celebrated on 9 October every year since 2011 to commemorate the day the Indian Cabinet created the Foreign Service.

Selection 

Officers of the Indian Foreign Service are recruited by the Government of India on the recommendation of the Union Public Service Commission. In 1948, the first group of Indian Foreign Service officers were recruited based on the Civil Services Examination conducted by the Union Public Service Commission This exam is still used to select new foreign service officers. Previous to 1948, some were appointed directly by the Prime Minister and included former native rulers of India who had integrated their provinces into India.

Fresh recruits to the Indian Foreign Service are trained at Sushma Swaraj Foreign Service Institute after a brief foundation course at the Lal Bahadur Shastri National Academy of Administration, Mussoorie. In recent years, the number of candidates selected to the Indian Foreign Service has averaged between 25–30 annually.

Training
On acceptance to the Foreign Service, new entrants undergo significant training, which is considered to be one of the most challenging and longest service trainings in the Government of India and nearly takes more than 1 year to graduate from. The entrants undergo a probationary period (during which they are referred to as Officer Trainees). Training begins at the Lal Bahadur Shastri National Academy of Administration (LBSNAA) in Mussoorie, where members of the other elite Indian civil services are trained.

After completing a 15-week training at the LBSNAA, the probationers join the Sushma Swaraj Foreign Service Institute, India in New Delhi for a more intensive training in a host of subjects important to diplomacy, including international relations theory, military diplomacy, trade, India's foreign policy, history, international law, diplomatic practice, hospitality, protocol and administration. They also go on attachments with different government bodies and defense (Army, Navy, Air Force, CAPF) establishments and undertake tours both in India and Indian missions abroad. The entire training program lasts for a period of 12 months.

Upon the completion of the training program at the Institute, an officer is assigned a compulsory foreign language (CFL) training. After a brief period of desk attachment in the Ministry of External Affairs, at the rank of Assistant Secretary, the officer is posted to an Indian diplomatic mission abroad where her/his CFL is the native language. There the officer undergoes language training and is expected to develop proficiency in the CFL and pass an examination before being allowed to continue in the service.

Functions

Ambassador, High Commissioner, Consul General, Permanent Representative of India to the United Nations and Foreign Secretary are some of the offices held by the members of this service. As a career diplomat, the Foreign Service Officer is required to project India’s interests, both at home and abroad on a wide variety of issues. These include bilateral political and economic cooperation, trade and investment promotion, cultural interaction, press and media liaison as well as a whole host of multilateral issues.

Career and rank structure

The below rank structure is for Indian Foreign Service officers who directly enter the service. (in ascending order of rank)

Major concerns and reforms

Under strength
India has one of the most understaffed diplomatic forces of any major country in the world. Based on 2014 calculations there are about 2,700 "diplomatic rank" officers in overseas missions and at headquarters. A minority of the diplomatic officers are Foreign Service (A) officers, the senior cadre of Indian diplomacy, which is primarily drawn from direct recruitment through the Civil Services Examination. Although sanctioned strength was 912, the actual strength of Group A was 770 officers in 2014. In addition there were in 2014, 252 Grade-I officers of Indian Foreign Service (B) General Cadre who after promotion are inducted into Indian Foreign Service (A). The lower grades of the Indian Foreign Service(B) General Cadre included 635 attaches. The breakdown of other cadres and personnel included 540 secretarial staff, 33 from the Interpreters Cadre, 24 from the Legal and Treaties Cadre, and 310 personnel from other Ministries.

Shashi Tharoor, a chairman of the Parliamentary Standing Committee on External Affairs, had presented the 12th report for expanding and building the numbers, quality and capacity of India's diplomats.

Declining prestige and quality
Since its inception and especially in the early decades of the service, the Indian Foreign Service had a reputation for attracting the country's most talented civil service aspirants. The quality of candidates based on exam rank has significantly declined and the quality of candidates has created concerns about harm to prestige in expanding the size of the service.

In the 1960s and 1970s, exam toppers generally in the top 20 opted for the Indian Foreign Service over the Indian Administrative Service and Indian Police Service, the other elite civil services. By late 1980s, the dip was appreciable and Indian Foreign Service spots did not fill until reaching much deeper down the list. The Indian Foreign Service continues in recent years to have difficulty in attracting the most promising candidates. For the 2017 Civil Services Exam, only 5 of the top 100 candidates chose the Indian Foreign Service with the last ranking person from the General Category in the 152th position. For candidates with reservation status, a candidate from the Scheduled Castes and Scheduled Tribes in the 640th position closed the list for Indian Foreign Service. The Indian Foreign Service has become less attractive due to higher pay in corporate jobs, other elite civil services like the All India Services promising more power, and fading glamour as foreign travel became common place.

A parliamentary committee reviewing Indian Foreign Service reform in 2016 feared a negative feedback loop with the "deterioration" in candidate quality as both a "both a symptom and a reason for the erosion of prestige in the Indian Foreign Service". However, the committee was hard pressed to address the issue because it was also concerned about increasing the "quantity" of Indian diplomats. T. P. Sreenivasan, a retired Foreign Service officer, argued in 2015 that "elitism should be preserved" for the Indian Foreign Service to perform effectively. He further lamented the Indian Foreign Service "is already a shadow of its former self" which dissuaded aspirants and the service needed to have its "attractiveness enhanced".

Maid abuse and sexual violence
Several incidents involving maid abuse including alleged sexual abuse by Indian Foreign Service officers have caused disruption for bilateral relations with the countries where incidents occur. The heavy handed treatment by US authorities in arresting and strip searching Indian Foreign Service officer Devyani Khobragade stirred up outrage within India about the country's global image and shined the international spotlight on the treatment of maids by Indian diplomats.

New York Consulate-General
The arrest of Devyani Khobragade was one of three main incidents between 2010–2013 associated with Indian diplomats living in the United States. The Ministry of External Affairs made a proposal in 2013 to the Ministry of Finance to grant maids the status of government employees but the initiative was found too expensive.

A maid for Prabhu Dayal, then the Consul-General in New York, escaped from the Upper East Side consular residence in January 2010. In 2011, the maid Santosh Bhardwaj filed a lawsuit with the representation of the Legal Aid Society against Prabhu Dayal, his wife Chandini Dayal and daughter Akansha Dayal in the United States District Court for the Southern District of New York. The suit alleged she worked long hours 7 days a week against the terms of her work contract. She recounted running away with the assistance of the consular security guard and a family she met through the security guard after an "inappropriate sexual advance" by Prahbu Dayal asking from her a leg massage. The case was settled by Dayal in 2012 for an undisclosed sum.

Another New York-based case involved Neena Malhotra who was press counselor at the Consulate General in New York from 2006 to 2009. Malhotra and her husband Joseph Malhotra were sued in 2010 for slavery in the United States District Court for the Southern District of New York by their former maid. The lawsuit alleged the family took away the passport of the maid and threatened her with beating and rape if she traveled alone. The court awarded a judgment of US$$1,458,335 against the Malhotras. A year after the judgment, Malhotra denied a visa for a US diplomatic spouse on the basis of homosexuality. As of 2016, the judgment remains unpaid.

Devyani Khobragade

The most notable diplomatic incident of maid mistreatment embroiled Devyani Khobragade, the then Deputy Consul General of the Consulate General of India in New York City. She was arrested in December 2013 by US Department of State's Diplomatic Security Service and charged with visa fraud for failing to pay a minimum wage for Sangeeta Richard, who traveled from India to serve as Khobragade's maid. While in custody Khobrgaade was subjected to "the indignities of repeated handcuffing, stripping, and cavity searches". Khobragade was declared by the US government to be persona non grata after her indictment in January 2014 and refusal of the Indian government to waive immunity. Her treatment caused outrage in India and led to a diplomatic row between India and the United States. The support received by Khobragade in India was wide ranging. Prime Miniser Manmohan Singh criticised the actions of the US authorities as "deplorable". The Delhi Police removed security barricades on the road outside the US Embassy in New Delhi, citing need for improvement of traffic flow in that area. The Indian government ordered the expulsion of US diplomat Wayne May in January 2014 because he had assisted Richard's family in securing T-visas and traveling to the United States.

Amrit Lugun
The case of Lalita Oraon in 1999, a servant-girl in the household of Amrit Lugun, then first secretary at the Indian embassy in Paris, prompted outcry in French media and cast a shadow on bilateral relations. Oraon was from a Scheduled Tribe in Bihar and by her account an orphan given to Lugun's family at the age of eight. She fled Lugun's residence and was taken into custody by the French police after wandering the streets of Paris. Oraon alleged she was beaten, threatened, and sexually abused by her employer. Police put her in the care of Committee Against Modern Slavery, an anti-slavery NGO, at a convent where she attempted suicide by jumping from a high wall. Oroan was examined by medical staff at Hôpital Cochin in Paris. According to a doctor speaking to Le Monde, Oraon had suffered "knife wounds, three to 6cm deep, all around the vagina" and described the injuries as "consistent with an act of torture or deliberate mutilation".

The Indian Ambassador in Paris at the time Kanwal Sibal strongly supported Lugun and prevented a full fledged enquiry into the matter by the MEA. In a statement, the Indian Embassy accused the anti-slavery group of "indecent lies" against Lugun and claimed Oraon had suffered cuts to her genitals while jumping off the wall to escape from the convent.

Jawid Laiq writing for Outlook commented that the case was not only an example of deplorable behavior by a diplomat towards a fellow Indian but represented larger problems in a Foreign Service with a "caste (and racist) hierarchy". According to Laiq, Foreign Service officers from low caste backgrounds were rarely ambassadors in "coveted embassies in the white, Western countries" but were rather sent to hardship spots. As of 2020, Lugun is Indian Ambassador to Greece.

Spying
A number of diplomats have been sent home to India from foreign postings on the suspicion of spying. One officer has been convicted under the Official Secrets Act. Madhuri Gupta, an Indian Foreign Service (B) officer, was arrested in 2010 and convicted in 2018 for spying for Pakistan's Inter-Services Intelligence. Gupta served as a Second Secretary in Islamabad where she became involved in a relationship with a man believed to be a Pakistani agent and passed classified information to him. She was sentenced to three years in prison after her conviction in 2018. Outlook speculated that as a single woman in her 50s, she was vulnerable to recruitment or could have been motivated due to job disgruntlement. A reason according to the Indian Express for her dissatisfaction with the Ministry of External Affairs was she "felt discriminated against being a Group B Foreign Service officer".

Discrimination against Indian Foreign Service (B) 
Indian Foreign Service (B) is the subordinate/feeder service of the Indian Foreign Service (A). The Indian Foreign Service (B) officers are seen as less prestigious by Indian Foreign Service (A) officers. The direct recruit Indian Foreign Service (A) officers are appointed after qualifying in the Civil Services Examinations, while Indian Foreign Service (B) officers are appointed through all India Combined Graduate level open competitive exams or, the Combined Higher secondary level competitive exams (for stenographers) conducted by Staff Selection Commission (SSC) and can later be inducted into Indian Foreign Service (A) through promotion. The relationship between A and B cadres is marked by territorial grievance and rivalry. A former Indian ambassador, Satyabrata Pal, noted tensions and discrimination between cadres have become worse in the 2010s compared to previous decades.

At the level of Grade-I, Indian Foreign Service (B) officers can be inducted into Indian Foreign Service (A) on promotion. Indian Foreign Service (B) officers complain of discrimination against them by Indian Foreign Service (A) officers. A Facebook group voicing objections of Indian Foreign Service (B) officers sprung up in 2016 when Indian Foreign Service (B) officer Tajinder Singh, Second Secretary in the Indian embassy in Lisbon died of an apparent suicide. The Facebook group, Indian Foreign Service B-Z, alleged Singh was forced to give up his choice assignment in Washington, D.C., after serving in a hardship posting in Damascus, for the posting instead in Lisbon. After the setback the group claimed Singh committed suicide due to despair from "discrimination and professional challenges from Indian Foreign Service (A) officers in the ministry".

Discrimination against stenographers
Indian Foreign Service (B) General Cadre have an acrimonious rivalry with the Indian Foreign Service (B) Stenographers Cadre. While Indian Foreign Service (B) General Cadre is considered lower in prestige than the Indian Foreign Service (A), its officers consider the stenographers to be "even lower in the order".

The Indian Foreign Service (B) has two sub-cadres, the Indian Foreign Service (B) General Cadre and Stenographers Cadre through separate entrance exams conducted by the Staff Selection Commission. The Stenographers Cadre (selected through matric/higher secondary level exam) provides secretarial assistance, while the Indian Foreign Service (B) General Cadre (mainly selected through graduate-level competitive exams) provides administrative support. In 2009, the path to promotion to Indian Foreign Service (A) was closed for the Stenographers Cadre. (A).

The rivalry was brought to the fore when a stenographer was appointed as Indian Ambassador to North Korea in 2012. No Indian Foreign Service officer had wanted the posting in "godforsaken" Pyongyang. Indian Foreign Service(B) officers vociferously protested the appointment due to the perceived "threat to its purported priority in ambassadorial postings" and fears of additional claimants in the future to a "small piece of cake". Three different associations representing Indian Foreign Service (B) officers complained to the Prime Minister’s Office and the external affairs minister, demanding the appointment be cancelled and calling it a "national shame to appoint a stenographer as the envoy to such a strategic country". A senior official in the Ministry of External Affairs speaking to The Telegraph rejected the complaint and compared it to a "caste system that the Indian Foreign Service (B) is trying to impose".

Notable Indian Foreign Service Officers 

Ajay Bisaria
Asaf Ali, former Governor of Odisha
Abid Hasan, a former officer of Indian National Army
Arundhati Ghose
Benegal Rama Rau, 4th Governor of Reserve Bank of India
Brajesh Mishra, 1st National Security Advisor
Binay Ranjan Sen, Director General of FAO (1956-67)
C. B. Muthamma
Chokila Iyer, 23rd Foreign Secretary of India
Gautam Bambawale, former ambassador to China and Pakistan
Gopalaswami Parthasarathy, former Vice-chancellor of Jawaharlal Nehru University
Hamid Ansari, former Vice President of India (2007-17)
Hardeep Singh Puri, current cabinet minister (2014-present)
Harsh Vardhan Shringla, former Foreign Secretary of India
J N Dixit, 2nd National Security Advisor & former Foreign Secretary
Kamlesh Sharma, former Commonwealth Secretary-General
Kanwal Sibal, former Foreign Secretary
Kewal Singh, former Foreign Secretary
K. M. Panikkar
K.P.S. Menon
K. R. Narayanan, 10th President of India and 9th Vice President of India
K. Raghunath, former Foreign Secretary
Lakshmi Kant Jha, 8th Governor of Reserve Bank of India
Lalit Mansingh
Maharaja Krishna Rasgotra
Mani Shankar Aiyar
Meira Kumar, 15th Speaker of the Lok Sabha (2009-14)
Nalin Surie
Natarajan Krishnan, President of the UNSC
Natwar Singh, former Minister of External Affairs
Nirupama Rao, former Foreign Secretary
Pankaj Saran, former Deputy National Security Advisor
Ranjan Mathai, former Foreign Secretary
Raveesh Kumar
Ronen Sen, former Ambassador to USA, UK, Russia, Germany and South Korea
Ruchira Kamboj, 1st women Permanent Representatives of India to the UN 
Salman Haider, former Foreign Secretary
Shashank
Shivshankar Menon, 4th National Security Advisor
Shyam Saran, 26th Foreign Secretary of India
Subimal Dutt, 3rd Foreign Secretary of India
S Jaishankar, Minister of External Affairs (2019-present)
Sujatha Singh
Syed Akbaruddin, former India's Permanent Representative to the UN
T. N. Kaul
T. S. Tirumurti
Venu Rajamony
Vijay K. Nambiar, Chef de Cabinet of the United Nations (2007-12)
Vijay Keshav Gokhale, 32nd Foreign Secretary of India
Vinay Mohan Kwatra

Vikas Swarup, eminent writer
Vikram Misri, Deputy National Security Advisor
Yashvardhan Kumar Sinha, current Chief Information Commissioner of India

Notes

References

External links

Official website of Foreign Service Institute India

Central Civil Services (India)
Foreign relations of India
Indian Foreign Service